Magsaysay may mean:
 Ramon Magsaysay (1907–1957), the seventh President of the Philippines
 Ramon Magsaysay Jr. (born 1938), his son, a former Philippine senator
 The Ramon Magsaysay Award, was established in Ramon Magsaysay's honor

Places in the Philippines named after Ramon Magsaysay
 Magsaysay, Davao del Sur, a municipality
 Magsaysay, Lanao del Norte, a municipality
 Magsaysay, Libjo, a barangay in the province of Dinagat Islands
Magsaysay, Malaybalay, a barangay
 Magsaysay, Misamis Oriental, a municipality
 Magsaysay, Occidental Mindoro, a municipality
 Magsaysay, Palawan, a municipality
 Ramon Magsaysay, Zamboanga del Sur, a municipality
Magsaysay Boulevard, a street in Metro Manila
 Fort Magsaysay in Nueva Ecija